Bal Tabarin is a 1952 American drama film directed by Philip Ford and starring Muriel Lawrence, William Ching, Claire Carleton and Steven Geray. The film was released on June 1, 1952 by Republic Pictures.

Synopsis
Judy Allen, a struggling American singer takes a job as a secretary to a wealthy man. When he is then killed, she flees from the police and takes shelter in the Paris apartment of her friend Stella Simmons. There she manages to get a job performing at the Bal Tabarin nightclub.

Cast    
Muriel Lawrence as Judy Allen
William Ching as Don Barlow
Claire Carleton as Stella Simmons
Steve Brodie as Joe Goheen
Steven Geray as Inspector Manet
Carl Milletaire as Little Augie
Jan Rubini as Violinist
Tom Powers as Eddie Mendies
Gregory Gaye as Jean Dufar
Adrienne D'Ambricourt as Madame Ramquet
Herbert Deans as Inspector Llewelyn
The Famous French Can-Can Dancers as Ensemble

References

Bibliography
 Martin, Len D. . The Republic Pictures Checklist: Features, Serials, Cartoons, Short Subjects and Training Films of Republic Pictures Corporation, 1935-1959. McFarland, 1998.

External links 
 

1952 films
American drama films
1952 drama films
Republic Pictures films
Films directed by Philip Ford
American black-and-white films
Films set in Paris
Films set in Los Angeles
1950s English-language films
1950s American films